Jackson Township is one of ten townships in Newton County, Indiana. As of the 2010 census, its population was 382 and it contained 178 housing units.

Geography

Cities and towns
 Mount Ayr

References

External links
 Indiana Township Association
 United Township Association of Indiana

Townships in Newton County, Indiana
Townships in Indiana